Goodallia may refer to:
 Goodallia (bivalve), a genus of bivalves in the family Astartidae
 Goodallia (plant), a genus of plants in the family Thymelaeaceae
 Goodallia, an extinct genus of bivalves in the family Ungulinidae, synonym of Microstagon